Frerichs is a surname. It may refer to:

Courtney Frerichs (born 1993), American middle-distance runner specializing in steeplechase 
Dieter Frerichs, director for two of the K1 funds a British Virgin Islands based hedge fund that collapsed
Don Frerichs (1931–2019), American businessman and politician
Friedrich Theodor von Frerichs (1819–1885), German pathologist
Gerret Frerichs, German record producer and part of German trance group Humate until 1996, after which he assumed the name himself for his solo work 
Jason Frerichs, American politician, state senator from South Dakota
Mike Frerichs (born 1973), American administrator, State Treasurer of Illinois
Ralph R. Frerichs, professor of Epidemiology
Rembrandt Frerichs, Dutch pianist